This is a list of notable CBBC and CBeebies presenters from when in-vision presentation was launched in September 1985.

Presenters

CBBC

 Phillip Schofield
 Andy Crane
 Gordon the Gopher
 Tracy Brabin
 Anthea Turner
 Siobhan Maher
 Colin Heywood
 Sue Devaney
 Wilson the Butler
 Edd the Duck
 Andi Peters
 Philippa Forrester
 Esther McVey
 Toby Anstis
 Zoë Ball
 Chris Jarvis
 Josie D'Arby 
 Otis the Aardvark (Dave Chapman)
 Grant Stott
 Simeon Courtie
 Gail Porter
 Kirsten O'Brien
 Dominic Wood
 Richard McCourt
 Steve Wilson
 Ana Boulter
 Emlyn the Gremlyn
 Michael Underwood
 Adrian Dickson
 Angellica Bell
 Fearne Cotton
 Ortis Deley
 Kate Heavenor
Jake Humphrey
Andrew Hayden-Smith
Sophie McDonnell
Gemma Hunt
Barney Harwood
Anne Foy
Matt Edmondson
Rani Price
Ed Petrie
Oucho T. Cactus (Warrick Brownlow-Pike)
Ciaran Joyce
Holly Walsh
Daniel Clarkson
Sam Nixon
Mark Rhodes
Iain Stirling
Hacker T. Dog (Andy Heath; Phil Fletcher)
London Hughes
Chris Johnson
Dodge T. Dog (Warrick Brownlow-Pike) 
Ben Hanlin
Shannon Flynn
Ceallach Spellman
Katie Thistleton
Karim Zeroual
Lauren Layfield
B1ink Bot 3 (Warrick Brownlow-Pike)
Ben Shires
Rhys Stephenson
Max and Harvey
Kia Pegg
Millie Innes

CBeebies

Sue Monroe
Chris Jarvis
Pui Fan Lee
Sidney Sloane
Justin Fletcher
Sarah-Jane Honeywell
Eva Alexander
Andy Day
Alex Winters
Cerrie Burnell
Katy Ashworth
Cat Sandion
 Dodge T. Dog (Warrick Brownlow-Pike)

References

CBBC presenters
CBBC